The National Public Safety Commission is the policy making and oversight body of the national police forces in Japan and South Korea.

National Public Safety Commission (Japan)
National Public Safety Commission (South Korea)

See also 
 Public safety